The Snake King's Wife Part 2 (Khmer:ពស់កេងកង ភាគពីរ Puos Keng Kang Pheak Pii, Thai:งูเกงกอง ภาค 2, also Giant Snake 2 and Snake Girl 2: Revenge) is a 1973 Cambodian-Thai horror film, a sequel to the early 1970s film The Snake King's Wife. The film's plot progressed its story from the prequel which was co-produced by Cambodia and Thailand and starring Cambodians Chea Yuthorn (ជា យុទ្ធថន) and Dy Saveth (ឌី សាវ៉េត), together with Thai Aranya Namwong (อรัญญา นามวงศ์).

Plot
The story continued from the happiness of Cantra's family which turned to sadness and terror because of black magic. This was caused by the love and revenge of a young pretty woman who wanted to put a spell to her father and turned her mother into a half wood-Human woman and Cantra's hair became the little snake again. However, the revenge of Cantra began. Then poisonous snakes including cobra and python started hurting everyone who stayed at the cruel plan, into the terrible death and a horror legend started told about the revenge between the ghost spirit and the snake girl.

References

1973 films
1973 horror films
Khmer-language films
Thai-language films
Thai multilingual films
Cambodian horror films
Thai horror films
Films about snakes
Thai sequel films
1973 multilingual films